Ismat Ahmed Chowdhury is a Bangladesh Awami League politician and the former Member of Parliament of Habiganj-1. He was the organizer of the Liberation War of Bangladesh.

Career
Chowdhury fought in the Bangladesh Liberation war. He was elected to parliament from Habiganj-1 as a Bangladesh Awami League candidate in 1986.

References

Awami League politicians
Living people
3rd Jatiya Sangsad members
Mukti Bahini personnel
Year of birth missing (living people)
People from Nabiganj Upazila